On November 7, 2006, Washington, D.C., held an election for its mayor. It determined the successor to two-term mayor Anthony A. Williams, who did not run for re-election. The Democratic primary was held on September 12.  The winner of both was Adrian Fenty, the representative for Ward 4 on the D.C. Council. He took office on January 2, 2007, becoming the sixth directly elected mayor since the establishment of home rule in the District, and — at 35 — the youngest elected mayor of a major American city in U.S. history.

Candidates

General Election

Adrian Fenty - Democratic Party
David Kranich - Republican Party
Chris Otten - D.C. Statehood Green Party

In addition to the candidates above, the following candidates lost in the primary election.

Democratic Party primary

Linda W. Cropp - DC Council Chair, Cropp was considered Fenty's rival as the frontrunner for the mayoral primary, although Fenty took a lead in the polls about two months before the election.
Marie Johns
Vincent Orange, Ward 5 Council Representative
Michael A. Brown, who consistently had trailed the pack in polling data, dropped out of the race September 8, and announced he was throwing his support to Cropp.

Republican Party primary
David W. Kranich ran in the Republican Party primary election. Albert Ceccone gathered signatures to run on the ballot as well, but after a challenge by Kranich, the District of Columbia Board of Elections and Ethics declared many of the signatures invalid. Consequently, Ceccone did not have enough valid signatures to appear on the ballot, and only Kranich's name appeared as running for mayor on the Republican primary ballot. Kranich received 65% of the vote.

Statehood Green Party primary
Chris Otten ran unopposed for the Statehood Green party's primary election. Otten received 50% of the vote.

Endorsements
Fenty received the endorsements of, most notably, The Washington Post and former mayor Marion Barry.
Cropp received the endorsement of, most notably, outgoing mayor Anthony A. Williams.
Orange received the endorsement of, most notably, recently terminated Metrobus driver Sidney Davis, as highlighted in the August 21, 2006 article, "Soapbox on Wheels", in The Washington Post.
Johns received the endorsement of, most notably, The Washington Times.

References

External links
 Slate profile of Kranich

2006
Washington
mayoral
Washington, D.C.